Mauricie tourism represents an important sector of the economy with some 1.2 to 1.5 million visitors each year who spend more than three million nights and spend some 200 to 300 million dollars per year in tourist attractions and services. In 2011, 90% of tourists in Mauricie are Quebecers; other tourists come from other Canadian provinces (3%), United States (2%) and other (4%).

Territory of La Mauricie
The nature and the outdoors is its brand. Within its boundaries, the region has one of the oldest places of occupation in Quebec, Trois-Rivières founded in 1634, the second largest city in New France; there are among the oldest manors and several cantons; have taken place among the most important phases in the history of Quebec (fur trade, metallurgy, forestry, hydropower, industrialization, etc..). The history and culture are also part of its brand.

The Mauricie is one of the 22 tourist areas in Quebec. Its territory is the same as Mauricie administrative region of the same name. Between Montreal and Quebec, it is divided into six sub-areas or sectors which correspond to the divisions of the three cities and three regional county municipalities: Trois-Rivières, Shawinigan, La Tuque, Maskinongé, Les Chenaux Regional County Municipality, Mekinac Regional County Municipality. The tourist region has 42 municipalities and 7 union territories.

Mauricie owes its name to the Saint-Maurice River that crosses the region from St. Lawrence River to the north.

Mauricie Tourism
“Mauricie Tourism” is the regional tourism organization responsible for the development and enhancement of tourism products Mauricie, in consultation with local tourism organizations planning. “Tourisme Mauricie” is a non-profit and non-governmental purpose. The main mission is to promote the tourism offer régionale.

History of tourism 
In 1634, Samuel de Champlain sent Sieur de Laviolette to establish a new fort that was also used as a fur trading post. The term "Mauricie" is used for the first time in 1933 by Bishop Albert Tessier to denote the region since Trois-Rivières to the gates of Lac Saint-Jean. Before that date, it was simply called the Valley of Saint-Maurice.

The origin of tourism in Mauricie is as old as the region itself. When Idebon Raclos came to renew his three daughters in 1671, it remained only time to settle in Mauricie then he returned to France by the last vessel. In tourism statistics, it would have been rated for its motivation, in the category of personal reasons. But maybe he was also behind the head to visit relatives and friends or simply leisure tourism, the story does not say, but at least his fortune allowed. You had to be determined to make a return France-Québec. The sea voyage was an adventure at that time! Adventure tourism...

In the 18th century, the population of the Mauricie was renowned for the quality of its reception, as any one established along the Chemin du Roy (King's Road), the first tourist route in the Mauricie. In 1749, the Swedish Pehr Kalm wrote: "Few foreign cities in which people in word and deed, welcome someone with much politeness than does the farmer in all areas of the Canadian campaign (St. Lawrence Valley)". In 1796, in turn, speaking for the reception in 24 relay stations of Chemin du Roy, Irish Isaac Weld reported: "We do not find in all North America also drive well served as that conduit Québec in Montreal. ... Scarcely were we saw people of the house, the postmaster, his wife and the whole family came out to receive us with precipitation."

In 1760, just weeks after the conquest, The British Magazine highlights a corner of the Mauricie publishing a print showing a picturesque view of Trois-Rivières, accompanied a short text which refers to the romantic situation, the wealth of the inhabitants, their well-built houses, their production and their fisheries. This is perhaps the number one tourist promotion. And in 1825 the first tourist guides have a major attraction of the Mauricie, the majestic falls Shawinigan, already famous, at least since 1816, with artists and travelers. Joseph-Édouard Turcotte built in 1858 a 100-room hotel with which he wanted to attract American tourists, but the building remained unfinished.

Then the American guides present the saline Saint-Léon as a mecca for health tourism: hotel (1849–1906) which was built there were 154 rooms (as large as the current Delta Trois-Rivières), a pavilion, bathroom, billiards, bowling, tennis, croquet, etc. During the summer season, it was the appointment of the Canadian and American elite. They made their picnics falls from Sainte-Ursule. In 1905, its customers 450 residents overflowed into the houses that had opened in the area.

Known for its forests, Mauricie host many hunters and fishermen from before 1850 Private clubs receive famous visitors such as parents of John-F. Kennedy. It is said that going to Saint-Alexis-des-Monts, Americans stopped at the post office of the rank of Bout-du-Monde (1908–1952), at Saint-Paulin, there to be stamped with the seal of their letters Bout-du-Monde ! The Winchester Club, founded in 1880 in Saint-Élie-de-Caxton is one of the first clubs in Quebec. These clubs have given way to ZECS (Controlled harvesting zone), Quebec Wildlife Reserves, outfitters and the La Mauricie National Park.

The religious side, the miracle eye of Notre-Dame-du-Cap Basilica in 1888 will mark the launch of pilgrimages. The same founder, Father Frederic, another site will attract religious tourists at the end of 19th century: the plight of Saint-Élie-de-Caxton replica of the Via Dolorosa in Jerusalem. Many buses in the United States or elsewhere in Canada will go to these two places. In Cap-de-la-Madeleine, a branch of the railway line will be called the Rosary.

This tourist excitement to the origins of tourism in Mauricie was desired and noted: in 1936, Bishop Albert Tessier reported that foreign customers is important,  Foreign cars are enumerated bridge Grand-Mère.

Today, Mauricie is one of the busiest tourist areas in Quebec. She received in 2010 more than 1.5 million tourists who spent $298 million to the regional economy. A proportion of 13% of these expenditures are made by tourists from outside Quebec. Even today it continues to be renowned for its natural attractions, cultural attractions, its municipalities and adventure tourism.

Tourism subregions 
The development and enhancement of tourism products and services in the Mauricie are grouped within six tourism sub-regions whose areas correspond to two of the three big cities, agglomeration and three regional county municipalities.

Trois-Rivières 
Since the municipal mergers of 2002, the territory of the city of Trois-Rivières is composed of group of six former municipalities: Sainte-Marthe-du-Cap, Cap-de-la-Madeleine, Trois-Rivières, Trois-Rivières, Pointe-du-Lac and Saint-Louis-de-France.

Shawinigan 
Since the municipal mergers of 2002, the territory of the city of Shawinigan is composed of the group of eight former municipalities: Shawinigan, Shawinigan-Sud, Lac-à-la-Tortue, Saint-Georges, Saint-Gérard-des-Laurentides, Saint-Jean-des-Piles and Grand-Mère, which already included Sainte-Flore.

Agglomeration of La Tuque 
The La Tuque (urban agglomeration) was created in 2006 to consolidate the city of La Tuque, the two municipalities La Bostonnais and Lac-Édouard, and three Indian reserves Coucoucache, Obedjiwan and Wemotaci.

Since the 2002 municipal mergers and divisions in 2006, the territory of the town of La Tuque is composed of the combination of three former municipalities, La Tuque, Parent and La Croche, and eight former unorganized territories, Petit-Lac-Wayagamac, Lac-des-Moires, Lac-Tourlay, Kiskissink, Lac-Berlinguet, Rivière-Windigo, Lac-Pellerin and Obedjiwan.

Les Chenaux 
The territory of the tourist subregion Les Chenaux corresponds to the territory of the regional county municipality of the same name. It is composed of ten municipalities: Batiscan, Champlain, Notre-Dame-du-Mont-Carmel, Sainte-Anne-de-la-Pérade, Sainte-Geneviève-de-Batiscan, Saint-Luc-de-Vincennes, Saint-Maurice, Saint-Narcisse, Saint-Prosper and Saint-Stanislas.

Maskinongé 
The territory of the tourism sub-region "Maskinongé" is the territory of the regional county municipality of the same name. It consists of seventeen municipalities:
Charette, Louiseville, Maskinongé, Saint-Alexis-des-Monts, Saint-Barnabé, Saint-Boniface, Sainte-Angèle-de-Prémont, Saint-Édouard-de-Maskinongé, Saint-Élie-de-Caxton, Saint-Étienne-des-Grès, Sainte-Ursule, Saint-Justin, Saint-Léon-le-Grand, Saint-Mathieu-du-Parc, Saint-Paulin, Saint-Séverin and Yamachiche.

Mekinac 
The territory of the tourist subregion "Mekinac" is the territory of the regional county municipality of the same name. It is composed of ten municipalities and four unorganized territories: Grandes-Piles, Hérouxville, Lac-aux-Sables, Lac-Boulé (TNO), Lac-Masketsi (TNO) Lac-Normand (TNO), Notre-Dame-de-Montauban, Rivière-de-la-Savane (TNO), Saint-Adelphe, Sainte-Thècle, Saint-Roch-de-Mékinac, Saint-Severin, Saint-Tite and Trois-Rives.

Performance 
 1111 Associated companies in the tourism sector (2009)
 7031 camping sites (2009)
 2514 accommodation establishments (2009)
 4000 tourism jobs (annual average in 2009)

Words like "Tourist", "Tripper" and "Visitor" are not to be confused with each other. In 2010,  tourists  of all backgrounds have traveled in the Mauricie region for a total of  nights  and spent $298 000 000. On average, each stay lasted 2.4 nights in which every tourist has spent a total of $201 or $82 per night.

Sightseeing

Key Benefits 

Museum and exhibition center
 Borealis, history center of the paper industry
 Musée québécois de culture populaire
 Old Prison of Trois-Rivières

Parks and Historic Sites
 National Historic Site of Canada Forges du Saint-Maurice
 Melville Island Park
 La Mauricie National Park
 Mastigouche Wildlife Reserve
 Saint-Maurice Wildlife Reserve
 Batiscan River Park

Lodges and cottages
 Outfitter White Lake;
 Hotel Sacacomie, Saint-Alexis-des-Monts
 Auberge Le Baluchon, Saint-Paulin
 Lordship of Triton, La Tuque
 Outfitter Club Odanak, Lac Castor, La Tuque
 Auberge Le Flores, Shawinigan
 Sugar Shack Chez Dany, Trois-Rivières

Tourist buildings
 Notre-Dame-du-Cap Basilica, in Trois-Rivières (sector "Cap-de-la-Madeleine")
 La Cité de l'Énergie (Energy City) in Shawinigan

Entertainment
 Mattawin Adventure Centre, Trois-Rives
 Ice Fishing of Chenaux fishes, Sainte-Anne-de-la-Pérade

Entertainment and Events 
 Festival International de Danse Encore, Trois-Rivières
 Grand Prix Automobile de Trois-Rivières
 Festival Western de Saint-Tite (Western Festival of Saint-Tite)
 Festival International de la Poésie (International Poetry Festival), Trois-Rivières
 Le FestiVoix de Trois-Rivières (The VoiceFest of Trois-Rivières)
 Le Rendez-vous des peintres de Sainte-Flore (Painters rendez-vous of Sainte-Flore), Shawinigan

Tourist Circuits 
Two main tours are highlighted in Mauricie. The first being Chemin du Roi (King's Road), aka the road 138, connects the cities of Québec and Montreal along the Shore North of the river St. Lawrence River on the first paved road in Canada. As for the Route des Rivières, it highlights hydrography, mainly the Saint-Maurice River, the region offers many attractions along the way.

Agritourism 
In Mauricie, there are slightly more than 100 companies offering diversified farm services: farms, maple, food, breweries, gardens, horticultural, tours, u-pick, etc. These are places where you would get a variety of local products and where you can observe several types of animals such as goats, bison, wild boar and deer. Some food companies offer local produce Mauritius, such as cheeses, drinks and meats. Examples of these companies:
 Baker François Guay Inc, Trois-Rivières (sector Pointe-du-Lac)
 Boutique Gourmande Amalthea, La Tuque
 Sugar Shack Chez Dany, Trois-Rivières
 Chèvrerie and Boutique Angélaine, Bécancour

Accommodation 
 Tourist home, cottage, condo, studio (88)
 Outfitter (73)
 Hotel (68)
 Bed and breakfast (63)
 Camping (47)
 Holiday Centre (13)
 Unusual accommodation (9)
 Other accommodation establishment (9)
 Youth Hostel (3)
 Other

Infrastructure

Welcome and Information 
Tourism Mauricie region offers tourists 4 permanent offices and 9 seasonal offices.

Permanent offices
 Culture and Tourism Corporation Grand-Mère
 Tourism Committee of Saint-Alexis-des-Monts
 Tourism Trois-Rivières
 Tourist Information Office (TIO) Les Chenaux

Seasonal offices
 Maskinongé
 Tourism Corporation Batiscan
 ILO CLD Shawinigan
 Tourist Office (TAO) Saint-Élie-de-Caxton
 Tourist information station (RIT) Louiseville, Parc des Ursulines
 RIT Saint-Édouard
 RIT Saint-Mathieu
 RIT Saint-Paulin
 Tourism Haut-Saint-Maurice, La Tuque

Access to the Region 
You can access the area by air, non-commercial, per passenger buses, 13 Orléans Express posts, car, highway 40, 55 and roads 138, 153, 155, 157, 159 and by train, Via Rail Canada: La Tuque station and Shawinigan Station.

Persons with limited physical abilities

Tourism awards

See also

Related article
 Mauricie
 Trois-Rivières
 Shawinigan
 La Tuque
 La Mauricie National Park
 Batiscan River Park
 La Mauricie National Park
 La Cité de l'Énergie, Shawinigan thematic park

References

Bibliography 

 Appartenance Mauricie, Le tourisme en Mauricie : une histoire qui voyage (Tourism in Mauricie: a story that travel), Calendar 2010, Shawinigan, Appartenance Mauricie Société d’histoire régionale (Belonging to Mauricie - Regional Historial Society), 2009. PDF version available on web site of "Appartenance Mauricie"

External links 

 Bonjour Quebec
 Tourisme Mauricie
 Tourism in Trois-Rivières
 Association de mototourisme de la Mauricie (Mototourism Association of Mauricie)
 Touristic guide of La Mauricie 
 La Mauricie National Park

Tourism in Quebec
Mauricie
Tourist attractions in Mauricie